Myconeesia is a genus of fungi in the family Xylariaceae.

The genus name of Myconeesia is in honour of Christian Gottfried Daniel Nees von Esenbeck (1776–1858), who was a prolific German botanist, physician, zoologist, and natural philosopher. 

The genus was circumscribed by Wilhelm Kirschstein in Ann. Mycol. vol.34 on page 200 in 1936.

References

Xylariales